Tate is an American Western television series starring David McLean that aired on NBC from June 8 until September 14, 1960. It was created by Harry Julian Fink (the creator of Dirty Harry and T.H.E. Cat), who wrote most of the scripts, and produced by Perry Como's Roncom Video Films, Inc., as a summer replacement for The Perry Como Show. Richard Whorf guest-starred once on the series and directed the majority of the episodes. Ida Lupino directed one segment.

Overview

David McLean starred as Tate, who lost the use of his left arm during the American Civil War. Because he was injured at the Battle of Vicksburg in Mississippi, Tate's arm is covered in black leather and a glove and supported by a sling. Tate is a widower, but the cause of the death of his wife, Mary, is not  specified in the series, although a gunfight seems likely. Tate had left his hometown as a teenager because of such a fight. At the urging of Marshal Morty Taw, whom viewers meet in the pilot episode, "Home Town", Tate arrives to help Taw hang an old childhood friend, played by James Coburn, who has murdered four people.

Tate roams the Old West as a bounty hunter-gunfighter. True to the nature of most hired guns on television Western series, Tate was discriminating as to for whom he worked, and would change sides if he found himself misled by his employers. As a gunman, he is wickedly fast on the draw. He also carries a shotgun, in his words, "to help even the odds." His reputation precedes him, and other men often seek him out in a gunfight...often to their regret.  The fact that Tate is physically disabled made him the first handicapped lead character in television history, and paved the way for future programs  Ironside with Raymond Burr and Longstreet, starring James Franciscus.

Background and production

Some references cite that Tate was recorded on videotape; at the time, most nonlive programs were shot on film. In fact, the series was filmed, as evidenced by quality of DVD copies of episodes. The misconception seems to come from the name of Como's production company; in this case, the "Video" in Roncom Video Films, Inc. meant they made films for television.

Sponsored by Kraft Foods, Tate was a summer replacement show, filling in for the second half-hour of Perry Como's Kraft Music Hall as part of the Kraft Summer Theater. Airing after the sitcom Happy, with Ronnie Burns, Tate did not develop the popularity in its short run to be extended thereafter as a regular series.

At the time, McLean was already well known as the Marlboro Man, one of the more famous spots in advertising history. McLean died in 1995 of lung cancer, brought on by many years of smoking.

On October 30, 2007, the entire run of 13 episodes was released in a Region One, three-DVD set by Timeless Media Group. Most of the series is in the public domain.

Guest stars

Robert Redford was cast in two episodes some six weeks apart, as John Torsett in "The Bounty Hunter" and as Tad Dundee in "Comanche Scalps", the latter segment with Leonard Nimoy as the Comanche and veteran character actor Lane Bradford as William Essey.

Others cast on Tate were:

Julie Adams
Chris Alcaide
Patricia Breslin
James Coburn
Robert Culp
Royal Dano
Ted de Corsia
Louise Fletcher
Peggy Ann Garner
Jock Gaynor
Marianna Hill

Martin Landau
Mort Mills
Warren Oates
Paul Richards
Bing Russell
Robert F. Simon
Vaughn Taylor
Warren Vanders
Peter Whitney
Don Wilbanks

Episode list

References

External links

Tate opening credits on YouTube

1960 American television series debuts
1960 American television series endings
1960s Western (genre) television series
Black-and-white American television shows
NBC original programming